A landing helicopter dock (LHD) is a multipurpose amphibious assault ship which is capable of operating helicopters and has a well deck. The United States Navy (USN) and the Royal Australian Navy (RAN) use the term as a hull classification symbol.

LHD vessels are built with a full flight deck similar in appearance to an aircraft carrier to operate utility and attack helicopters. Some can also operate tilt rotor aircraft such as the MV-22 Osprey and VSTOL aircraft such as the AV-8 Harrier and the F-35B Lightning II. Examples of this kind of ship include the USN's , French Navy's  and ships of the Spanish Navy's Juan Carlos I class including those designs based on the class, such as the Royal Australian Navy's . Other nations also use the designation for their vessels, such as the Republic of Korea Navy for its .

The Landing Helicopter Assault (LHA) USN warship classes both precede and follow the ships classed LHD. Most LHAs also have well decks of a comparable size to LHDs, with the exception of the first two  ships (LHA-6 and LHA-7) which lack the well deck entirely, taking the space for larger aviation facilities. However, LHA-8 will feature a well deck, returning the terms to their more interchangeable state.

See also
 Amphibious assault ship
 Helicopter carrier
 List of amphibious warfare ships
 List of United States Navy amphibious warfare ships § Amphibious Assault Ship (Multi-Purpose) (LHD)

References

Amphibious warfare vessels
Helicopter carriers